Mudugar indigenous people live mainly in the Attappadi valley in Palakkad district of Kerala, South India.It was also reported that Some Mudugar also live in Cuddalore district, Nilgiri District and Dharmapuri District of Tamil Nadu.

Disambiguation
The Mudugar are often misidentified as Muthuvan or Muduvan, even in the Census of India List of Scheduled Tribes. 
In fact, Muthuvan and Muduvan are one and the same and live far away, predominantly in the Cardamom Hills and Anamalai hills of  Idukki district.
,

indigenous people are also loosely referred to as Adivasis, tribals, tribes people, Scheduled Tribe or just hill people.

Population
Census of Kerala identified 9,903 Mudugar individuals from 2,185 families living in 88 settlements covering 67.6 km² in the state.

The main traditional occupation of the Mudugars is collection and trading of non-timber forest products like honey, spices, herbs, medicines and wild foods.

Many of the Mudugar and Irula now work as day laborers and porters. Some work for the Forest Department in Silent Valley National Park as  forest guards and visitor guides. There is a plan to employ  50 additional men from these 21 tribal settlements as forest guards for Rs.500/man/month.

16 out of 21 tribal hamlets in the Attappady range are notorious for ganja cultivation. Many tribals live in abject poverty and are easily recruited by the so-called ganja mafia.

Customs
Marriage is normal at age 12 to 14 years and includes many rituals and ceremonies. The wedding is usually conducted in the groom's house. The groom has to give dowry to the bride's father. There is a grand vegetarian feast on the wedding day.

It is normal and acceptable for an adolescent to marry their first or second cousin or even the second spouse of a parent. Occurrence of in-breeding is up to 80%, resulting in a significantly high combined in utero, infant and child mortality rate of 38%. Polygamy is prevalent.

Birth: Before her delivery a woman is kept in a separate specially made hut near her house. When birth contractions begin, a mid wife who has mastery over sorcery, accompanies her. After delivery the women and the baby are declared unclean for six months. She leads a peaceful life without domestic work for three months, with the husband doing her usual tasks.

Death: When a person dies, couriers travel throughout the hamlets, chanting the name of the dead. The relatives and the neighbors sprinkle coriander mixed with water on the dead body and a coin is pasted on the forehead. The dead body is completely covered with a white cloth and placed in a bamboo cot. The people who come for the burial service resolve any problems they had with the dead person and thus he is expected to be completely freed for his eternal journey.

A whole day is spent dancing and singing, thanking god for letting the person live as long as they did. In that dance they show symbols that God gave and God took. Mudugar people do not cry when somebody dies. When the father dies, his first-born son tonsures his head and when the mother dies the second son tonsure his head. If there are no males in the family girls do so instead.

Decreasing child birth 
Sixty five families living in Vellimudi and Sankarankudy villages in Valparai taluk in Coimbatore district in Tamil Nadu have reported no child birth in the past ten years (2000–2010). This was followed by 4 to 7 children in each family in previous years. Decrease in child birth has also been observed in Muduvar people living in Poochikottaparai, Selaiyoothu, Karumutti, Vasambukulam villages near Udumulai. While the causes leading to infertility is unknown, it will likely have a severe impact on Muduvar population.

References 

Indigenous peoples of South Asia
Social groups of Kerala
Social groups of Tamil Nadu